Thomas Benton may refer to:

Thomas Hart Benton (painter) (1889–1975), American painter and muralist
Thomas Hart Benton (politician) (1782–1858), U.S. Senator from Missouri and great uncle of the painter
Thomas W. Benton (1930–2007), American artist known for his political posters
William Pannapacker (born 1968), American English professor who has written under the pen name "Thomas H. Benton"